Scrobipalpula is a genus of moths in the family Gelechiidae.

Species
Scrobipalpula acuta Povolný, 1990
Scrobipalpula agnathos Povolný, 1987
Scrobipalpula albolineata Povolný, 1987
Scrobipalpula antiochia Powell & Povolný, 2001
Scrobipalpula artemisiella (Kearfott, 1903)
Scrobipalpula atra Povolný, 1987
Scrobipalpula caustonae Landry, 2010
Scrobipalpula crustaria (Meyrick, 1917)
Scrobipalpula daturae (Zeller, 1877)
Scrobipalpula densata (Meyrick, 1917)
Scrobipalpula diffluella (Frey, 1870)
Scrobipalpula ephoria (Meyrick, 1917)
Scrobipalpula equatoriella Landry, 2010
Scrobipalpula erigeronella (Braun, 1921)
Scrobipalpula eurysaccomima Povolný, 1987
Scrobipalpula fallacoides (Povolný, 1987)
Scrobipalpula fallax (Povolný, 1987)
Scrobipalpula falcata Povolný, 1987
Scrobipalpula fjeldsai Povolný, 1990
Scrobipalpula flava Povolný, 1987
Scrobipalpula gregalis (Meyrick, 1917)
Scrobipalpula gregariella (Zeller, 1877)
Scrobipalpula gutierreziae Powell & Povolný, 2001
Scrobipalpula hastata Povolný, 1987
Scrobipalpula hemilitha (Clarke, 1965)
Scrobipalpula henshawiella (Busck, 1903)
Scrobipalpula hodgesi (Povolný, 1967)
Scrobipalpula incerta Povolný, 1989
Scrobipalpula inornata Landry, 2010
Scrobipalpula isochlora (Meyrick, 1931)
Scrobipalpula keiferioides Povolný, 1987
Scrobipalpula latisaccula Povolný, 1987
Scrobipalpula latiuncula Povolný, 1987
Scrobipalpula lutescella (Clarke, 1934)
Scrobipalpula lycii (Powell & Povolný, 2001)
Scrobipalpula manierreorum Priest, 2014
Scrobipalpula megaloloander Povolný, 1987
Scrobipalpula melanolepis (Clarke, 1965)
Scrobipalpula motasi Povolný, 1977
Scrobipalpula ochroschista (Meyrick, 1929)
Scrobipalpula omicron Povolný, 1987
Scrobipalpula pallens Povolný, 1987
Scrobipalpula parachiquitella Povolný, 1968
Scrobipalpula patagonica Povolný, 1977
Scrobipalpula physaliella (Chambers, 1872)
Scrobipalpula polemoniella (Braun, 1925)
Scrobipalpula potentella (Keifer, 1936)
Scrobipalpula praeses (Povolny, 1987)
Scrobipalpula psilella (Herrich-Schaffer, 1854)
Scrobipalpula radiata Povolný, 1987
Scrobipalpula radiatella (Busck, 1904)
Scrobipalpula ramosella (Muller-Rutz, 1934)
Scrobipalpula rosariensis Povolný, 1987
Scrobipalpula sacculicola (Braun, 1925)
Scrobipalpula semirosea (Meyrick, 1929)
Scrobipalpula seniorum Povolný, 2000
Scrobipalpula simulatrix (Povolný, 1987)
Scrobipalpula stirodes (Meyrick, 1931)
Scrobipalpula subtenera Povolný, 1987
Scrobipalpula tenera Povolný, 1987
Scrobipalpula transiens Povolný, 1987
Scrobipalpula trichinaspis (Meyrick, 1917)
Scrobipalpula tussilaginis (Stainton, 1867)

Status unclear
Scrobipalpula pygmaeella (Heinemann, 1870), described as Lita pygmaeella

References

 
Gnorimoschemini